St. Louis Simpkins-Ford (also known as Simpkins) was a U.S. amateur soccer team based in St. Louis, Missouri from 1947 to 1956.  It won three league championships and the 1948 and 1950 National Challenge Cups, and lost in the finals of the 1954 National Amateur Cup.  Five members of the U.S. team at the 1950 FIFA World Cup came from Simpkins.

Origin
In 1947, a St. Louis amateur soccer team sponsored by Carrenti Cleaners changed sponsorship to the Joe Simpkins Ford Auto dealership.  Renamed St. Louis Simpkins-Ford, the team entered the new St. Louis Major League in 1948. The team revamped its roster, bringing in several top St. Louis players.  Five of them,  Robert Annis, Gino Pariani, Charlie Colombo, Frank Borghi and Frank Wallace, were on the U.S. team which competed at the 1950 World Cup.

Year by Year

1947-1948
Despite its outstanding roster, Simpkins struggled in its first season in the St. Louis Major League.  The League featured only four teams, De Andreis, St. Louis Raiders, Steamfitters and Simpkins.  Simpkins finished third with eleven points and a 4–5–3 record.  While it struggled in league play, it dominated the National Challenge Cup winning the title with a 3–2 victory over the professional New York Brookhattan of the American Soccer League (ASL).

1948-1949
In 1949, Simpkins improved on its finish the previous season when it ended in second place.  This year the team placed three players on the national team at the 1949 NAFC Championship.

1949-1950
In 1950, Simpkins took both the league title and the National Challenge Cup.  While most National Cups have been decided in a single game, this year the organizers opted for a home and away series.  On April 22, 1950, Simpkins defeated Fall River Ponta Delgada 2–0.  The second leg, held on May 7, 1950, ended in a 1–1 tie with Simpkins taking the title on aggregate.  It was this year that Simpkins contributed five of its players to the U.S. team at the 1950 FIFA World Cup.  In that tournament, the U.S. went 1–2, but its victory was the greatest upset of World Cup history as the U.S. defeated heavy favorites England.

1950-1951
Simpkins success of 1949-1950 did not continue into the 1950-1951 season.  While the team began strong, it ended up second behind Zenthoefer Furs in the standings.

1951-1952
Simpkins again finished second in the league, this time to St. Louis Raiders.

1952-1953
While Simpkins was beginning to fade, finishing third in the league, it won the St. Louis Major League’s first post season round-robin by defeating Kutis 3-1.  Despite the addition of a post-season, the St. Louis Major League folded at the end of the season when their stadium was sold.  Simpkins and Kutis moved to the Municipal League, essentially a second division league, for the 1954 season.

1954
As a lower division league, the Municipal League fielded several more teams, divided into a North and South Division, than the old St. Louis Major League.  Simpkins showed its strength by taking the South Division.  Simpkins also went to the finals of the National Amateur Cup only to fall to Pittsburgh Beadling 7-6 on aggregate.  While Simpkins had just joined the Municipal League, mismanagement by the league’s front office convinced the team to leave the league and join with several other ex-Municipal League teams to form a competing league, known as the Khoury League as it was formed by George Khoury.

1955
Simpkins won the first year of the Khoury League with a perfect 13-0-0 record.  Frank Borghi was selected as the league MVP.  Simpkins also went to the semifinals of the  National Challenge Cup before falling to Los Angeles Danes.

1956
In 1956 Simpkins again won the Khoury League.

Record

Coaches
 Joe Numi 1950

External links
 History of soccer in St. Louis

Association football clubs established in 1947
Defunct soccer clubs in Missouri
Simpkins-Ford
1947 establishments in Missouri
U.S. Open Cup winners